Henderson Williams was a state legislator in Louisiana who served in the Louisiana House of Representatives for Madison Parish. He was first elected in 1868, and again to serve in the 1870-1872 session.  Henderson was one of the "colored" legislators who appealed to U.S. president Ulysses S. Grant in a January 9, 1872 letter to intervene in a dispute with fellow Republican governor Henry C. Warmoth.

February 10, 1872, he and other "colored" legislators signed a letter in support of Warmoth. He also co-signed a letter calling for the removal of James F. Casey as collector of the Port of New Orleans.

In 1869, Williams and Curtis Pollard were authorized to operate a ferry in Madison Parish.

He died August 1874.

References

Republican Party members of the Louisiana House of Representatives
Year of birth missing
1874 deaths
People from Madison Parish, Louisiana
African-American state legislators in Louisiana
African-American politicians during the Reconstruction Era
Place of birth missing
Place of death missing